Chi Draconis (χ Dra, χ Draconis, Chi Draconis) is a star system in the constellation Draco. It also has the Flamsteed designation 44 Draconis.

Description

The first companion is a yellow-white (class F) fourth-magnitude star with a mass approximately equal to that of the sun, but it is nearly twice as luminous. The second companion is an orange (class K) sixth-magnitude star, that is less massive and of lesser luminosity than the sun. In 1898 this system was reported to be a spectroscopic binary system, with an orbital period of 280.55 days. The two stars have an average separation of nearly an astronomical unit, which would disrupt the orbit of any Earth-like planet that was close enough to the primary to support liquid water. The two stars have less than half the abundance of heavy elements as the Sun and are approximately a billion years older. Separations between the two stars have been measured and the difference in brightness between the two stars is 2.12 magnitudes at 700 nm.

See also
 List of star systems within 25–30 light-years

References

External links
 ARICNS
 Chi Draconis 2 at SolStation.
 nStars database entry

Draco (constellation)
Binary stars
Draconis, Chi
F-type main-sequence stars
K-type main-sequence stars
Draconis, Chi
089937
Draconis, 44
6927
170153
Durchmusterung objects
0713